The 2007 Dutch TT was the ninth round of the 2007 MotoGP championship. It took place on the weekend of 28–30 June 2007 at the TT Circuit Assen in Assen, Netherlands.

MotoGP race report

This race was most notable for Valentino Rossi's comeback from eleventh on the grid to win the race, beating the superior Casey Stoner-Ducati-Bridgestone combination as well.

Chris Vermeulen took pole position on Saturday - his first of the season and third and final of his career overall - followed by Casey Stoner and Randy de Puniet on the Kawasaki. On the second row of the grid is Marco Melandri, John Hopkins and Colin Edwards in fourth, fifth and sixth. Yamaha teammate Valentino Rossi started down in eleventh after a poor qualifying in the wet. Toni Elías did not take part in the race after he broke his leg in one of the free practice sessions.

Before the start of the formation lap, the Pramac Ducati bike of Alex Hofmann stalled on the grid, causing some of the crewmembers to run onto the track with equipment to restart it. The other riders take off and do their usual warm-up lap before lining up in their respective grid slots. As the lights go out, Stoner takes the lead on the opening lap as the blasts past Vermeulen into the Haarbocht (Turn 1), followed by the other Australian and the American Hopkins. Behind them, Melandri slotted into fourth and Nicky Hayden fights with Edwards for fifth place, himself moving up six places in a few corners. Rossi has moved up one position into tenth as de Puniet has made an abysmal start and dropped back to eleventh position. All throughout the field there is action, with Capirossi overtaking Rossi and Hoffmann for ninth and Hopkins taking second from Vermeulen on the straight before the Ruskenhoek (Turn 8). Rossi passes Hoffmann on the short, kinked section between the Stekkenwal (Turn 10) and De Bult (Turn 11), moving up into ninth. Hayden lines up a move on the outside of the Ramshoek (Turn 17), then taking fifth on the inside of Edwards at the beginning of the Geert Timmer Bocht (Turn 18).

Lap two begins and Stoner already has a big advantage over second place Hopkins. Pedrosa also takes sixth from Edwards on the start/finish straight. Hayden then takes fourth from Melandri at the Mandeven, going up the inside of the Gresini Honda rider.

Going into lap three and Pedrosa makes the move on Melandri for fifth at the start/finish straight. He tries to fight back, but to no avail. Capirossi closes up to Melandri, with Rossi doing the same to the Ducati rider. He tries to pass Capirossi at the start of the Geert Timmer Bocht, but isn't able to do so.

Lap four and Rossi has now finally managed to pass Capirossi, going side by side with him at the start/finish straight and into the Haarbocht, moving him up to eighth. At the Ossenbroeken, Edwards makes the move on Melandri by going side by side with him on the outside, then finalising the pass down at the inside of the Strubben hairpin, moving him up to sixth. At the front, Hayden spectacularly manages to surprise Vermeulen as they go into the Ruskenhoek, going up the inside, outbreaking him and sliding sideways into the corner, grabbing second in the process. Hopkins' gap to Stoner is now +1.299 seconds and Pedrosa takes third from the Suzuki rider at the entrance of De Bult corner. Rossi overtakes teammate Edwards for seventh at the entrance of the Geert Timmer Bocht by going up his inside.

On lap five, the gap Hopkins has to Stoner has increased - it is now +1.365 seconds. Rossi is slowly catching fourth place Vermeulen, then overtakes him by going up his inside in a surprise attack at the right-hand Mandeven turn, promoting him to sixth place.

Lap six and the gap Hopkins has to Stoner has increased again, this time being +2.507 seconds. Melandri meanwhile has lost various positions and is now behind Randy de Puniet in tenth place. Rossi is hunting down Pedrosa for fifth.

Lap seven begins and Rossi has closed the gap to Pedrosa and Hayden. He makes a move on Pedrosa coming out of the Ramshoek and entering the Geert Timmer Bocht, moving up to fourth.

On lap eight, the gap Hopkins has to Stoner has decreased massively and is now only +1.057 seconds. Going into the Mandeven, Rossi dives down the inside of Hayden and takes third position away from him. Further back, de Puniet managed to overtake Melandri and Capirossi and is now in eighth place. Edwards meanwhile went down the inside with Vermeulen for sixth at the Ossebroeken, then overtook him at the outside of the Strubben hairpin.

Lap nine and Alex Barros overtakes Melandri for ninth at the start/finish straight. However, the surprised Barros by retaking the spot at the Ossebroeken when he went a tad too wide, allowing the Italian to get back at him. Barros - making good use of the superior straight line speed - then takes the place at the Veenslang straight. Rossi is still slowly closing the gap to Hopkins.

On lap ten, the gap Rossi has to Hopkins is +1.282 seconds, which decreased to +0.889 when he arrived at sector one, then +0.763 at sector two, then +0.410 and then +0.184 when they cross the finish line.

Lap eleven begins and "The Doctor" is now all over the back of Hopkins. Exiting Strubben and coming onto the Veenslang, Rossi effortlessly took second place from a fading Hopkins, now setting his sights on Stoner at the front. Randy de Puniet meanwhile crashes out of the race after he was shadowing Vermeulen in the first half of the lap. When entering the Mandeven sequence of right hand corners, he tried to pass Vermeulen by going up his inside. He however, closed the door on him, and with the Frenchman nowhere to go, collided with the rear of Vermeulen, sending him over his bike and into the gravel at high speed. Vermeulen went straight because of the Kawasaki being stuck on his rear and not allowing him to turn, forcing him wide through the gravel. He managed to return onto the track down in sixteenth place, but de Puniet was out.

On lap twelve, the top eight consists out of Stoner, Rossi, Hopkins, Hayden, Pedrosa, Edwards (+2.703 seconds behind), Barros (+10.380 seconds behind) and Anthony West (+2.614 seconds behind). The gap Rossi has to Stoner is +1.528 seconds.

As lap thirteen starts, Rossi manages to close in on Stoner, cutting the gap from +1.528 to +0.588 seconds at the start/finish straight. The Repsol Honda of Hayden has also closed the gap to Hopkins exiting the Veenslang. Rossi then has a look up the inside of Stoner entering the Geert Timmer Bocht, but thinks the better of it and tucks in behind Stoner.

Lap fourteen and Hopkins has lost two places to both Hayden (who is now third) and Pedrosa (who is now fourth) at the start/finish straight. Pedrosa also looks to dive down the inside of his teammate, but stays behind him for now. Rossi is still all over the back of Stoner.

On lap fifteen, Rossi ran a bit wide at the Ossenbroeken, gifting Stoner some breathing room. Further back, Melandri now has a train consisting out of West, Hoffmann and Carlos Checa. The Repsol Honda duo of Hayden and Pedrosa are now creating a significant gap to Hopkins.

Lap sixteen has begun and Rossi is still right behind Stoner, looking for a way past. Pedrosa meanwhile is also all over the back of Hayden. Rossi tries again at the exit of the Ramshoek to line up a pass at the Geert Timmer Bocht, but Stoner denies him again, closing the inside.

On lap seventeen, Capirossi - who was in a lowly fifteenth position - enters the pits to retire, as he has problems with the bike. Rossi still has not been able to pass Stoner so far.

Lap eighteen begins with Edwards closing in on a now fading Hopkins. At the back, Melandri is still battling with the trio of West, Hoffmann and Checa. Makoto Tamada, riding the Dunlop Yamaha, is also under pressure from the Konica Minolta Honda of Shinya Nakano. At the front meanwhile, Rossi is still trying at the Geert Timmer Bocht, but to no avail.

On lap twenty, Hayden was pulling away from Pedrosa in fourth. Rossi is still shadowing Stoner, looking for aa way past.

Lap twenty-one and Hoffmann at the back has taken eighth place from Melandri, who is still under pressure from West and Checa. He got overtaken on the previous lap by the Stekkenwal corner.

On lap twenty-two, Hayden extends his lead over Pedrosa to +1.7 seconds. Rossi is still right behind Stoner. West has overtaken Melandri for ninth at the entrance of the Geert Timmer Bocht by going up the inside of the Italian.

Lap twenty-three and Rossi finally manages to pass Stoner for the lead. He lines up the pass coming out of the Ramshoek, staying right behind Stoner until they come up to the Geert Timmer Bocht, then outbreaks Stoner as they enter the first of the three corners to overtake him.

Lap twenty-four begins and Rossi is now in the lead. He extends his gap up to +0.637 seconds.

On lap twenty-five - the penultimate lap -, the gap Stoner has to Rossi increases, it is now +0.841 seconds.

The last lap - lap twenty-six - has begun and Rossi has increased his gap to Stoner to +1.5 seconds. Hayden has also a big gap back to Pedrosa. No overtakes happened and Rossi jubilantly cruised to the flag to win the race - his third victory of the season. Behind him Stoner finished second and Nicky Hayden in third, making it his first podium of the season. In fourth place came Pedrosa, in fifth place Hopkins and in sixth place Edwards.

On the parade lap back to parc-fermé, Rossi stopped as some of his fans celebrated with him on the track, congratulating him for the win. After the little group celebration, he continues to ride back, standing on his bike and T-posing as he continues to celebrate on his own. Barros then rides next to him to congratulate him, shaking his hand, with Checa congratulating him as well from a distance. Stoner stops on the side of the circuit, probably because he has run out of fuel, with Rossi sitting in the middle of a target at the side of the circuit as a form of celebration, posing for a marshall who takes a picture. Another marshall hands him his bike as he is done, with multiple others taking photo's on their camera's. He then stops again in front of the TT Assen logo on the ground to celebrate once more while the other riders slowly make their way back to parc-fermé. Stoner is talking to the marshalls, probably asking for a ride back as his bike has run out of fuel, with Rossi then riding back to the pits, still celebrating with the marshalls who congratulate him. As Hayden rides back, his fans clap as he waves at the Repsol Honda tribune. The public does likewise as Rossi rides back.

Once back to parc-fermé, Hayden talks to and gets congratulated by his crewmembers. Rossi does as well with his clearly joyful team, hugging his crewmembers also. Stoner has now returned to parc-fermé on the back of a dirtbike as Stoner comes over to congratulate him on his win. All three riders are now talking to their teams before the podium ceremony begins. Rossi also hugs some of the Ducati members.

The trio walk up to the steps leading to the podium, the three then stepping onto the podium. The important figures hand out the trophies, with the crowd celebrating loudly as Rossi's name is mentioned. The Italian national anthem plays and then the trio sprays the champagne, with Hayden wearing an A-Style helmet as they do so.

Casey Stoner's lead has now been cut to 21 points after Rossi's win, with 185 and 164 the difference. Dani Pedrosa is a distant third with 119 points and John Hopkins fourth with 94 points.

MotoGP classification

250 cc classification

125 cc classification

Championship standings after the race (MotoGP)

Below are the standings for the top five riders and constructors after round nine has concluded.

Riders' Championship standings

Constructors' Championship standings

 Note: Only the top five positions are included for both sets of standings.

References

Dutch TT
Dutch
Tourist Trophy